The Catanduanes State University (CatSU) is a research and coeducational higher education institution and a green university in Catanduanes, Philippines. It is an ISO 9001:2015 certified public university.

The main campus is located in Calatagan, Virac. This institution is categorized as SUC Level III-A. It was established on June 19, 1971, by virtue of Republic Act 6341, authored by the Catanduanes Congressman Jose M. Alberto, which converted the Virac National Agricultural and Trade School into the Catanduanes State Colleges. On July 8, 1972, Republic Act 6590 provided for the opening of additional courses at CSC. It was elevated to university status in October 2012. Catanduanes State University is a comprehensive Higher Education Institution in the island province of Catanduanes and one of the dynamic SUCs in the region, offering a wide range of academic programs.

History
The beginning of Catanduanes State University (CatSU) dates back to June 18, 1961, when the enactment of Republic Act 3398 called for the establishments of Virac National and Agricultural Trade School (VNATS).

On October 19, 2012, President Benigno S. Aquino III signed Republic Act No. 10299 converting Catanduanes State Colleges (CSC) into Catanduanes State University (CatSU).

On January 31, 2022, CatSU Board of Regents approved 11 new curricular programs to be applied with the Commission on Higher Education. The eleven academic programs are as follows: Juris Doctor, Doctor of Medicine, MA in Nursing, BS Public Health, BS Radiologic Technologist, BS Medical Technology, BS Marine Engineering and Naval Architecture, BS Marine Transportation, BS Forestry, BS Fisheries (major in Ocean Science) and BS Textile Engineering.

Timeline 
 June 18, 1961 - The enactment of Republic Act 3398 called for the establishments of Virac National and Agricultural Trade School (VNATS)
 June 19, 1971 - Republic Act (RA) 6341 authored by Congressman Jose M. Alberto, converted VNATS into Catanduanes State Colleges (CSC) 
 December 1, 1971 - Started offering courses such as Associate in business education, Associate in commerce, Bachelor of Science in education, and Master of Arts in education, and Master of Arts in commerce.
 July 8, 1972 - By virtue of R.A 6590 started offering additional courses
 July 22, 1996 - The Tenth Congress of the Republic of the Philippines enacted and approved Republic Act No. 8292, which provides uniform composition and powers of the governing board, the manner of appointment and term of office of the President of chartered state universities and colleges, and for other purposes.
 October 31, 1999 - The Catanduanes Agricultural and Industrial College (CAIC) was integrated to Catanduanes State Colleges (CSC)
 March 29, 2011 - House Bill No. 4170, An act converting the Catanduanes State Colleges in the province of Catanduanes, into a State University to be known as the Catanduanes State University, and appropriating funds therefor’’ was filed by Congressman Cesar V. Sarmiento and co-authored by Congressman Juan Edgardo M. Angara. 
 July 14, 2011 - Dr. Minerva I. Morales was elected as the sixth and the last President of the Catanduanes State Colleges
 October 19, 2012 - President Benigno S. Aquino III signed Republic Act No. 10299 converting Catanduanes State Colleges (CSC) (Virac/Main and Panganiban Campus) into Catanduanes State University (CatSU).
 December 12, 2012 - March 24, 2013 - Dr. Minerva I. Morales designated by CHED as University Officer In-Charge in consonance with the provision of R.A. 10229.
 March 25, 2013 - Dr. Minerva I. Morales voted as the First President of the Catanduanes State University and the first female CatSU President.
 June 24, 2021 - Dr. Patrick Alain T. Azanza was elected as the Second President of CatSU. The first male President of the Catanduanes State University.
 August 24, 2021 - CatSU inks Memorandum of Understanding with Kansas State University and 12 Higher Education Institutions (HEIs) plus SEARCA.
 September 13, 2021 - CatSU launches Online Student and Faculty Portals.
 October 8, 2021 - The Department of Trade and Industry (DTI) and the Catanduanes State University (CatSU), launched the Catanduanes Fabrication Laboratory (FabLab). It is the fourth fabrication laboratory established in the Bicol Region.
 October 12, 2021 - The application for Knowledge, Innovations, Science and Technology (KIST) Park and Agro-Industrial Economic and Processing Zone for CatSU has been approved by the Philippine Economic Zone Authority (PEZA) Board.

Organization and Administration

The governance of the university is vested in the Board of Regents, abbreviated as BOR.

The Chairperson of the Commission on Higher Education (CHED) serves as the Board's Chairperson while the President of the Catanduanes State University is the vice-chairman. The Chairpersons of the Committees of Higher Education of the Senate and the House of Representatives are also members of the University Board of Regents which are concurrent with their functions as committee chairpersons.

The university students is represented by a Student Regent, which is also the President of the CatSU Federated College Student Council. While the Faculty Regent is nominated by the faculty members of the CatSU Federated Faculty Union. And the University Alumni are represented by the President of the CatSU Alumni Association.

As of 2021, the members of the Board of Regents of the Catanduanes State University are:

President of the Catanduanes State University

 Dr. Patrick Alain T. Azanza

Degree programs

Graduate school

The Catanduanes State Colleges Graduate School was formally opened in summer of 1972, initially offering courses leading to the degree Master of Arts in education with 213 students. In 1975, the offering was expanded to include Master of Science in management and in summer of 1976, Master of Arts in teaching practical arts was opened.

 Doctor of Philosophy in Educational Management
 Doctor of Education Major in Educational Management
 Master of Arts in Educational Management
 Master of Arts in Mathematics Education
 Master of Arts in Filipino Education
 Master of Arts in English
 Master of Arts in Guidance and Counseling
 Master of Arts in Teaching Biology
 Master of Arts in Teaching Chemistry
 Master of Arts in Teaching Physics
 Master of Arts in Education
 Master of Arts in Agricultural Education
 Master of Arts in Industrial Education
 Master of Arts in Teaching Practical Arts
 Master of Science in Management Major in Agri-Business
 Master in Business Administration
 Master of Public Administration
 Graduate Program in Education (Mathematics, Filipino, Teaching English as a Second Language, Guidance and Counseling and Home Economics)
 Diploma in Public Administration
 Diploma in Educational Management
 Diploma in College Teaching
 Graduate Certificate in College Teaching

College of Education
The College of Education was one of the three pioneering colleges when the Virac National Agricultural and Trade School was converted to the Catanduanes State Colleges by virtue of RA 6341 in 1972.

Bachelor of Elementary Education
Bachelor of Secondary Education majors in:
Filipino
English
Mathematics
Science
Values Education
Social Studies
Bachelor of Physical Education
Bachelor of Culture and Arts Education
Bachelor of Technical Teacher Education majors in:
Electronics
Food and Service Managements

Laboratory Schools
K to 12

College of Engineering and  Architecture
Provide engineering education needed for personal growth, provincial and national development, as well as global competitiveness.

Bachelor of Science in Civil Engineering
Bachelor of Science in Computer Engineering
Bachelor of Science in Electronics and Communications Engineering
Bachelor of Science in Architecture

College of Humanities and Social Sciences

Bachelor of Public Administration
Bachelor of Science in Economics
Bachelor of Arts in Political Science

College of Industrial Technology
The College of Industrial Technology (formerly the College of Arts and Trades) was among the original colleges included in the charter of RA 6341, an Act creating the Catanduanes State Colleges. At present, the college is offering only the Ladderized Bachelor of Science in industrial technology approved per Board Resolution No. 63, s. 2012.

 Ladderized Bachelor of Science in Industrial Technology majors in:
Automotive Technology
Drafting Technology
Electronics Technology
Electrical Technology
Food Technology
Garments, Fashion and Design
Mechanical Technology
Heating, Ventilating, Refrigeration, and Air-Conditioning

College of Business and Accountancy
The College of Business and Accountancy, formerly the College of Business Administration was one of the pioneer colleges of the CSC during its inception in 1972. The college continues to be an active member of the Philippine Association of Collegiate School of Business (PACSB), Philippine Council of Deans and Educators in Business (PCEDEB), Association of Marketing Educators (AME), Council of Management Educators (COME), and Philippine Association of Educators in Office Administration Foundation, Inc. (ENEDA).

Accountancy and Accounting Related Courses
Bachelor of Science in Accountancy
Bachelor of Science in Internal Auditing
Bachelor of Science in Accounting and Information System

Business Education and Management
Bachelor of Science in Business Administration majors in:
Financial Management
Human Resource Management
Marketing Management
Bachelor of Science in Entrepreneurship
Bachelor of Science in Office Administration

College of Health Sciences

 Bachelor of Science in Nursing
 Bachelor of Science in Nutrition and Dietetics
 Diploma in Midwifery Education
 Realigned Laddered Program leading to Bachelor of Science in Nursing

College of Information & Communication Technology

 Bachelor of Science in Computer Science
 Bachelor of Science in Information Technology
 Bachelor of Science in Information Systems

College of Sciences
The College of Arts and Sciences is one of the pioneer colleges of the CSC when Republic Act No. 6341 converting the Virac National Agricultural and Trade School to Catanduanes State Colleges, was passed by Congress on June 19, 1971.

Bachelor of Science in Biology
Bachelor of Science in Mathematics
Bachelor of Science in Environmental Science

College of Agriculture and Fisheries
Formerly College of Agriculture, it begun its operation in 1972 when Republic Act 6590, an Act amending RA 6341, which authorizes the CSC Board of Trustees to open additional courses, was implemented. A total of 113 initial enrollees posted during the 1st semester of SY 1972–1973. In 2006, the college became an accredited member of the Association of Colleges of Agriculture in the Philippines (ACAP).

Bachelor of Science in Agribusiness
Bachelor of Science in Agriculture
Bachelor of Science in Fisheries
Certificate in Agriculture

Catanduanes State University – Panganiban Campus
 Bachelor of Elementary Education
 Bachelor of Technical Vocational Teacher Education major in:
Food and Service Management
 Bachelor of Science in Agriculture majors in:
General Science
Animal Science
Crop Science
 Bachelor of Technology and Livelihood Education majors in:
Agri-Fisheries Arts
Industrial Arts
 Two-Year Certificate in Agricultural Science

Laboratory Schools
 K to 12

Accredited Programs

Center of Development

Level III – Reaccredited

Level II – Reaccredited

Level I

Catanduanes State University – Panganiban Campus

Campuses

Main Campus
Located in Calatagan, Virac, Catanduanes. The campus houses the Graduate School, College of Agriculture and Fisheries, College of Arts and Sciences, College of Business and Accountancy, College of Education, College of Health Sciences, College of Engineering,  University College of Education - Integrated Laboratory School-Elementary and Laboratory School-High School Department, College of Information and Communications Technology, College of Industrial Technology and The university Research Extension Program Center.

Panganiban Campus

Located in Sta. Ana, Panganiban, Catanduanes. Courses offered in this campus are Bachelor of Science in Elementary Education, Secondary Education,  Industrial Education, Technical Teacher Education, Agriculture, Industrial Education and Two-Year Certificate in Agricultural Science. It manages Laboratory High school that specializes Science and Mathematics.

Recognition and Distinctions
The Catanduanes State University (CSU) was categorized as SUC Level III-A and one of PASUC-AIM Philippines’ Top 19 State Universities and Colleges in the Country with High Business Potential in Land and Equipment Assets, Human Resources, and Technological Capital. The university was also the recipient of Center of Development in Teacher Education award. The province of Catanduanes declared the university as Provincial Institute of Agriculture.

Recognition
CatSU was accorded the status of Center of Development (COD) in Business Administration by the Commission on Higher Education (CHED).

University Library
 Library Services
It caters mostly to students of the tertiary level, but it also renders service to secondary and elementary students who have their own respective mini libraries. It is also open to researchers from other institutions/agencies.

Student Services
 Admission and Registration – This office facilitates the admission and registration of students during the enrollment period. Other services such as the preparation and issuance of transcript of records, certifications, clearances, honorable dismissals and evaluation of student records are also undertaken by the admission and registration Office (ARO).
 Guidance and Testing Services – This office has a wide range of services such as conducting the CSU College Entrance Examinations (CSUCET), administering English Placement Tests, academic advising and career counseling.
 Placement and Alumni Services – This office informs student and graduates of the Colleges regarding possible employment opportunities. It keeps close contact with CSU graduates and awards annually the most outstanding alumni of the school. It also coordinates the organization of the CSU Alumni Association, the holding of jobs fair and the Special Program for Employment of Students (SPES).
 CatSU Multi-Purpose Cooperative – The CSU Multi-Purpose Cooperative provides wholesome snacks and nutritious meals to students and employees of the CatSU. Catering Services are also rendered upon request. Various items are available at the canteen such as school supplies, groceries, cosmetics and other commodities.
 Cashiering Services – Facilitates collection of school fees and release of scholarship benefits.
 Catanduanes Internet Network (CATNET) – The Catanduanes Internet Network (CATNET) is a test-bed project under the Government Information Sharing Technology Network (GISNET) which is a program within the telecommunications component of the National Information Technology Plan (NITP) 2000. Envisioned to provide the students of Catanduanes improved access to information, the CATNET is managed and operated by the CSU. At present, CATNET serves as the laboratory of CSU Students in the Information Management and Information Technology programs. It is also open to all students conducting research works.
 Hablon Dawani Theater – Formerly the HRD Building of the Colleges.
 Speech Laboratory 
 CatSU Multi-Purpose Covered Court – Situated at the back of the CSU Administration Building. It is also an arena for PE classes, induction balls, election rallies, similar related activities and even graduation ceremonies.
 Student Center – The CSU Student Center provides accommodation to the offices of the Supreme Student Council (SSC) and the Office of the Student Services, respectively.

Students

Organizations, fraternities and sororities

CENTRAL ORGANIZATIONS
 CatSU Federated College Student Council (CSU Main)
 The CSU Statesman (Official Tertiary Student Publication)
 Central English Club
 Samahang Sentral ng Filipino
 Mathematics Circle
 Kabataang Pangarap ni Rizal (KAPARIZ)
 Natural Science Society (NATUSSOC)
 Central PE Club
 Central Women's Circle (CWC)

COLLEGE OF AGRICULTURE AND FISHERIES
 College of Agriculture Fisheries & Student Body Organization (CAFSBO)
 Agriculture Student Organization (ASO)
 Student's Task is to be an Environmentalist Working Against Resources Destruction (STEWARD) Society
 CAF-English Club
 College of Agriculture and Fisheries Women's Club (CAFWC)

COLLEGE OF ARTS AND SCIENCES
 College of Arts and Sciences Student Body Organization (CASSBO)
 Organization of Future Public Servants (OFPS)
 Nutrition and Dietetics Association (NDA)
 Economics Society (ECOSOC)
 Biological Science Society (BIOSOC)
 Mathematics Society
 CatSU Debating Society
 Political Science Society (PSS)
 College of Arts and Sciences English Club (CASEC)
 College of Arts and Sciences Women's Club (CASWC)

COLLEGE OF BUSINESS AND ACCOUNTANCY
 College of Business & Accountancy Student Body Organization (CBASBO)
 Marketing Management Association (MMA)
 Junior Philippine Institute of Accountants (JPIA)
 Bus. Education and Office Administration League of Students (BEOALS)
 Young Entrepreneurs Society (YES)
 College of Business and Accountancy English Club (CBAEC)

PANGANIBAN CAMPUS
 CatSU-PC Student Body Organization
 Future Teachers Student Body Organization (FTSBO)
 College of Agriculture Student Body Organization (CASBO)

University Publication
 HERALD
 The CSU Statesman
 Abacatanduanes (Literary Folio)

Affiliations

Catanduanes State University is a member of the Philippine Association of State Universities and Colleges (PASUC) and its athletic Association, the State Colleges and Universities Athletic Association (SCUAA) and participates in all events.

References

Universities and colleges in Bicol Region
Universities and colleges in Catanduanes
Education in Catanduanes
Educational institutions established in 1961
State universities and colleges in the Philippines
1961 establishments in the Philippines